Captain Thomas Laurence Purdom  was a Scottish World War I flying ace credited with 13 confirmed aerial victories.

Early life and entry into military
Purdom was born in Hawick, Roxburghshire, the son John R. Purdom, a solicitor and joint Town Clerk. Purdom was working in his father's office when war was declared, and enlisted into the Public Schools Battalion. However, he was soon commissioned, becoming as a second lieutenant in the 4th (The Border) Battalion, The King's Own Scottish Borderers on 14 October 1914.

Aerial service
In 1915 Purdom was seconded to the Royal Flying Corps, receiving Royal Aero Club Aviators' Certificate No. 1873 after soloing a Maurice Farman biplane at the Military School, Birmingham, on 11 October 1915, and was appointed a flying officer on 18 January 1916.

He served in No. 15 Squadron throughout 1916, flying a B.E.2c two-seater reconnaissance aircraft, but had no successes in combat, as his unit was mainly engaged in such duties as artillery spotting and aerial photography.

Purdom was appointed a flight commander with the temporary rank of captain on 20 September 1916, and was transferred to the newly formed No. 62 Squadron, a training unit. In May 1917 the squadron received the Bristol F.2 Fighter, and in January 1918 was sent to France.

Success in the air finally came with a double victory on 21 March 1918, and with another on the 24th and two on the 26th, made Purdom and his gunner/observer Lieutenant Percival Chambers aces within a week. They continued to score and became double aces on 15 May. Two days later, they completed their dozen victories together with another double victory over Armentières. They had destroyed five enemy aircraft, including one shared with William Ernest Staton and John Rutherford Gordon. Their other eight victories were of the "driven down out of control" category. On 19 May 1918, Purdom and gunner William Norman Holmes drove a Fokker D.VII down out of control north-west of Douai. This was Purdom's thirteenth victory, and Holmes' sixth.

In June 1918 Purdom was awarded the Military Cross. His citation read:
Lieutenant (Temporary Captain) Thomas Laurence Purdom, KOSB and RFC.
"For conspicuous gallantry and devotion to duty. He attacked and shot down a hostile scout, and when himself attacked by a second scout, he shot the latter down out of control also. He has in addition to these destroyed four enemy machines within a month. He has shown the most exceptional gallantry and daring in engaging enemy aircraft."

Purdom returned to the Home Establishment in July 1918, after being injured, and was posted to the Aeroplane Experimental Station at Martlesham Heath on 15 September 1918. He eventually left the RAF, being transferred to the unemployed list on 19 February 1919.

Purdom was promoted to captain in his regiment, the King's Own Scottish Borderers, on 21 March 1919.

List of aerial victories

See also
 pList of World War I aces credited with 11–14 victories

References

Bibliography

1892 births
Year of death missing
People from Hawick
King's Own Scottish Borderers officers
Royal Flying Corps officers
Royal Air Force personnel of World War I
British World War I flying aces
Scottish flying aces
Recipients of the Military Cross
Scottish military personnel
British Army personnel of World War I
Royal Fusiliers soldiers
Middlesex Regiment soldiers
Royal Air Force officers